This bibliography of Woodrow Wilson is a list of published works about Woodrow Wilson, the 28th president of the United States. For a more comprehensive listing see Peter H. Buckingham, Woodrow Wilson: A bibliography of his times and presidency (Scholarly Resources Inc, 1990).

Biographical
 Auchincloss, Louis. Woodrow Wilson (Viking,  2000)
 Berg, A. Scott. Wilson (2013), full-scale scholarly biography
 Blum, John. Woodrow Wilson and the Politics of Morality  (1956); short scholarly biography
 Brands, H. W. Woodrow Wilson 1913–1921 (2003); short scholarly biography
 Cooper, John Milton. Woodrow Wilson: A Biography (2009), full-scale scholarly biography
 Hankins, Barry. Woodrow Wilson: Ruling Elder, Spiritual President (Oxford University Press, 2016). 
 
 Kennedy, Ross A., ed.  A Companion to Woodrow Wilson (2013), comprehensive coverage
 
 Link, Arthur S. "Woodrow Wilson" in Henry F. Graff ed., The presidents: A Reference History  (2002) pp. 365–388; short scholarly biography
 Link, Arthur Stanley. Wilson: The Road to the White House (1947), first volume of standard biography (to 1917); Wilson: The New Freedom (1956); Wilson: The Struggle for Neutrality: 1914–1915 (1960); Wilson: Confusions and Crises: 1915–1916 (1964); Wilson: Campaigns for Progressivism and Peace: 1916–1917 (1965), the last volume of 5-volume standard scholarly biography
 Maynard, W. Barksdale. Woodrow Wilson: Princeton to the Presidency (2008)
 Miller, Kristie. Ellen and Edith: Woodrow Wilson's First Ladies (University Press of Kansas, 2010)
 
 Post, Jerrold M. "Woodrow Wilson Re-Examined: The Mind-Body Controversy Redux and Other Disputations," Political Psychology (1983) 4#2 pp. 289–306 in JSTOR, on Wilson's self-defeating behavior
 ; full scale scholarly biography

Scholarly topical studies
 Allerfeldt, Kristofer. "Wilsonian Pragmatism? Woodrow Wilson, Japanese Immigration, and the Paris Peace Conference." Diplomacy and Statecraft 15.3 (2004): 545-572.
 Ambrosius, Lloyd E. "Woodrow Wilson and George W. Bush: Historical Comparisons of Ends and Means in Their Foreign Policies", Diplomatic History, 30 (June 2006), 509–43.
 Ambrosius, Lloyd E. Woodrow Wilson and American Internationalism (Cambridge University Press, 2017) 270 pp.
 Ambrosius, Lloyd E. Wilsonian Statecraft: Theory and Practice of Liberal Internationalism During World War I (1991)
 Ambrosius, Lloyd E. "Woodrow Wilson and World War I." in A Companion to American Foreign Relations (2003): 149+.
 Bailey; Thomas A. Wilson and the Peacemakers: Combining Woodrow Wilson and the Lost Peace and Woodrow Wilson and the Great Betrayal (1947); detailed coverage of 1919; Lost Peace online -- deals with negotiations in Paris; Great Betrayal online; deals with battle in Washington
 Burnidge, Cara Lea. 2016. A Peaceful Conquest: Woodrow Wilson, Religion and the New World Order. University of Chicago Press.
 Clements, Kendrick, A. Woodrow Wilson: World Statesman (1999)
 Clements, Kendrick A. The Presidency of Woodrow Wilson (1992), a standard scholarly survey
 Clements, Kendrick A. "Woodrow Wilson and World War I", Presidential Studies Quarterly 34:1 (2004). pp. 62+
 Davis, Donald E. and Eugene P. Trani. The First Cold War: The Legacy of Woodrow Wilson in U.S.-Soviet Relations (2002) online
 
 Flanagan, Jason C. "Woodrow Wilson's" Rhetorical Restructuring": The Transformation of the American Self and the Construction of the German Enemy." Rhetoric & Public Affairs 7.2 (2004): 115-148. online
 Greene, Theodore P., ed. Wilson at Versailles (1957) essays by scholars and primary sources
 Hofstadter, Richard. "Woodrow Wilson: The Conservative as Liberal" in The American Political Tradition (1948), ch. 10.
 Janis, Mark Weston. "The John Sloan Dickey Essay on International Law: How Wilsonian Was Woodrow Wilson." Dartmouth Law Journal  (2007): 1+. online
 Kazianis, Harry. "Woodrow Wilson: Civil War, Morality and Foreign Policy", E-International Relations  (2011), E-ir.info
 Kennedy, Ross A., ed. A Companion to Woodrow Wilson (2013), historiographical essays by scholars
 Knock, Thomas J. To End All Wars: Woodrow Wilson and the Quest for a New World Order (1995)
 Levin, Jr., N. Gordon. Woodrow Wilson and World Politics: America's Response to War and Revolution (1968)
 Link, Arthur S. Woodrow Wilson and the Progressive Era, 1910–1917 (1972) standard political history of the era online
 Link, Arthur S. Wilson the Diplomatist: A Look at His Major Foreign Policies (1957) online
 Link, Arthur S. Woodrow Wilson and a Revolutionary World, 1913–1921 (1982)
 Livermore, Seward W. Woodrow Wilson and the War Congress, 1916–1918 (1966)
 Malin, James C. The United States after the World War (1930) online
 Manela, Erez. The Wilsonian moment: self-determination and the international origins of anticolonial nationalism (Oxford UP, 2007).
 Pestritto, Ronald J. Woodrow Wilson and the Roots of Modern Liberalism (2005)
 Ruiz, George W. "The Ideological Convergence of Theodore Roosevelt and Woodrow Wilson". Presidential Studies Quarterly (1989). 19#1: 159–177. online
 Schwabe, Klaus, and Rita Kimber. Woodrow Wilson, Revolutionary Germany, and peacemaking, 1918-1919: missionary diplomacy and the realities of power (University of North Carolina Press, 1985).
 Startt, James. Woodrow Wilson and the Press: Prelude to the presidency (Springer, 2004).
 Trani, Eugene P. "Woodrow Wilson and the Decision to Intervene in Russia: A Reconsideration". Journal of Modern History (1976). 48:440–61. in JSTOR
 Tucker, Robert W. Woodrow Wilson and the Great War: Reconsidering America's Neutrality, 1914–1917 (2007)
 Vought, Hans. "Woodrow Wilson, Ethnicity, and the Myth of American Unity". In Myth America: A Historical Anthology, Volume II. 1997. Gerster, Patrick, and Cords, Nicholas. (editors.) Brandywine Press, St. James, NY. 
 Walworth, Arthur; Wilson and His Peacemakers: American Diplomacy at the Paris Peace Conference, 1919 (1986)
 Wolgemuth, Kathleen L. "Woodrow Wilson and federal segregation." Journal of Negro History 44.2 (1959): 158-173. online
 Wright, Esmond. "The Foreign Policy of Woodrow Wilson: A Re-Assessment. Part 1: Woodrow Wilson and the First World War" History Today. (Mar 1960) 10#3 pp 149-157
 Wright, Esmond. "The Foreign Policy of Woodrow Wilson: A Re-Assessment. Part 2: Wilson and the Dream of Reason" History Today (Apr 1960) 19#4 pp 223-231
 Yellin, Eric S. Racism in the Nation's Service: Government Workers and the Color Line in Woodrow Wilson's America (2013)

Unpublished PhD dissertations
Finished after 1992; all are available online at academic libraries.
 Behn, Beth A. "Woodrow Wilson's conversion experience: The president and the federal woman suffrage amendment" (University of Massachusetts Amherst ProQuest Dissertations Publishing, 2012. 3498330).
 Benbow, Mark Elliott. "Leading them to the promised land: Woodrow Wilson, covenant theology and the Mexican Revolution, 1913--1915" (Ohio University; ProQuest Dissertations Publishing, 1999. 9956767).
 Fernandez, Luke O. "Preparing students for citizenship: The pedagogical vision of Yale's Noah Porter, Harvard's Charles Eliot and Princeton's Woodrow Wilson" (Cornell University; ProQuest Dissertations Publishing, 1997. 9728389).
 Filozof, Michael Francis. "Woodrow Wilson and international human rights" (State University of New York at Buffalo; ProQuest Dissertations Publishing, 2000. 9958260).
 Hamel, William Christopher. "Race and responsible government: Woodrow Wilson and the Philippines" (Michigan State University; ProQuest Dissertations Publishing, 2002. 3075014).
 Jablonski, Joseph John, Jr. "The Dark Side of President Woodrow Wilson's Progressive Political Thought: Its Race-Historicism and Other Anti-Democratic Aspects" (The Claremont Graduate University; ProQuest Dissertations Publishing, 2018. 13424622).
 Kendall, Eric M. "Diverging Wilsonianisms: Liberal internationalism, the peace movement, and the ambiguous legacy of Woodrow Wilson" (Case Western Reserve University; ProQuest Dissertations Publishing, 2012. 3497646).
 Kraig, Robert Alexander. "Woodrow Wilson and the lost world of the oratorical statesman" (The University of Wisconsin - Madison; ProQuest Dissertations Publishing, 1999. 9927251).
 Kramer, Jacob. "The new freedom and the radicals: Woodrow Wilson, progressive views of radicalism, and the origins of repressive tolerance, 1900–1924" (City University of New York;' ProQuest Dissertations Publishing, 2006. 3232024).
 Moyer, Jason Ray. "Not just civil religion: Theology in the cases of Woodrow Wilson, John Kennedy, and Barack Obama" (The University of Iowa; ProQuest Dissertations Publishing, 2011. 3461205).
 Nabulsi, Kassem. "Presidential leadership in foreign policy: Woodrow Wilson, Harry Truman and George Bush in an international system undergoing transformation" (University of Southern California; ProQuest Dissertations Publishing, 1999. 3110957).

 Owen-Cruise, Sian Elizabeth. "'Out into pastures of quietness and peace such as the world never dreamed of before': An examination of Woodrow Wilson 's peace rhetoric as covenant creation. (Volumes I and II)" (University of Minnesota; ProQuest Dissertations Publishing, 1993. 9405346).
 Rinehart, John M. "The making of a Christian statesman: Woodrow Wilson's religious thought and practice, 1856–1910" (University of Illinois at Chicago; ProQuest Dissertations Publishing, 2006. 3248871).
 Rothra, John L. "Progressivism's impact on evangelism: The confluence of ideas between Woodrow Wilson and John R. Mott, and Barack Obama and Jim Wallis" (Southwestern Baptist Theological Seminary ProQuest Dissertations Publishing, 2014. 3580304).
 Schaffer, Samuel Lonsdale. "New South Nation: Woodrow Wilson's Generation and the Rise of the South, 1884–1920" (Yale University; ProQuest Dissertations Publishing, 2010. 3440588)
 Stid, Daniel Diehl. "Woodrow Wilson, responsible government, and the Founders' regime" (Harvard University; ProQuest Dissertations Publishing, 1994. 9421980).
 Yang, David William. "An agonized state of peace: The Lockean social contract theory of Woodrow Wilson" (The Johns Hopkins University; ProQuest Dissertations Publishing, 1996. 9617627).
 Zentner, Scot James. "Leadership and partisanship in the thought of Woodrow Wilson and the American founders" (Michigan State University; ProQuest Dissertations Publishing,  1994. 9512165).

Historiography
 Ambrosius, Lloyd. Wilsonianism: Woodrow Wilson and his legacy in American foreign relations (Springer, 2002).
 Bimes, Terry; Skowronek, Stephen. "Woodrow Wilson's Critique of Popular Leadership: Reassessing the Modern-Traditional Divide in Presidential History". Polity  (1996). 29#1: 27–63. doi:10.2307/3235274. 
 Cooper, John Milton, ed. Reconsidering Woodrow Wilson: Progressivism, Internationalism, War, and Peace (Johns Hopkins University Press, 2008)
 Cooper, John Milton. "Making A Case for Wilson," in Reconsidering Woodrow Wilson (2008) ch 1.
 Janis, Mark Weston. "How Wilsonian Was Woodrow Wilson?," Dartmouth Law Journal (2007) 5:1 pp. 1–15 online
 Kennedy, Ross A. "Woodrow Wilson, World War I, and an American Conception of National Security." Diplomatic History 25.1 (2001): 1-31.
 Johnston, Robert D. "Re-Democratizing the Progressive Era: The Politics of Progressive Era Political Historiography." Journal of the Gilded Age and Progressive Era 1.1 (2002): 68-92.
 Saunders, Robert M. “History, Health and Herons: The Historiography of Woodrow Wilson's Personality and Decision-Making.” Presidential Studies Quarterly 24#1 pp. 57–77. online
 Saunders, Robert M. In Search of Woodrow Wilson: Beliefs and Behavior (1998)
 Seltzer, Alan L. "Woodrow Wilson as" Corporate-Liberal": Toward a Reconsideration of Left Revisionist Historiography." Western Political Quarterly 30.2 (1977): 183-212.
 Smith, Daniel M. "National interest and American intervention, 1917: an historiographical appraisal." Journal of American History 52.1  (1965): 5-24. online
 Wertheim, Stephen. "The Wilsonian Chimera: Why Debating Wilson’s Vision Hasn’t Saved American Foreign Relations’." White House Studies 10.4 (2011): 343-359. online

Primary sources

Books written by Wilson
Selected items only. Older items are not included.
 
 
 On Being Human, 1897.
 The State: Elements of Historical and Practical Politics, 1898.
  volume I; volume II; volume III; volume IV; volume V.
 Constitutional Government in the United States, 1908.
 The New Freedom, 1913.
 When A Man Comes To Himself, 1915.
 The Road Away from Revolution, 1923.

Other primary sources

 August Heckscher, ed., The Politics of Woodrow Wilson: Selections from his Speeches and Writings (1956)
  69 volumes. Annotated edition of all of Wilson's correspondence, speeches and writings.
 . Memoir by Wilson's chief of staff.
  Arno Press reprint: 1981.
 
  3 volumes, 1918 and later editions.
 Woodrow Wilson, compiled with his approval by Hamilton Foley; Woodrow Wilson's Case for the League of Nations, Princeton University Press, Princeton 1923; contemporary book review
 Wilson, Woodrow. Messages & Papers of Woodrow Wilson 2 vol
 Wilson, Woodrow. The New Democracy. Presidential Messages, Addresses, and Other Papers (1913–1917) 2 vol 1926, 
 Wilson, Woodrow. President Woodrow Wilson's Fourteen Points (1918)
 Wilson, Woodrow. Presidential papers and personal library, Woodrow Wilson Library of the Library of Congress.
 The Study of Administration, 1887.
 Leaders of Men, 1890.

Notes

External links

Bibliographies of presidents of the United States
Books about politics of the United States
Political bibliographies
Bibliographies of people